2-Ethylhexanoic acid is the organic compound with the formula CH3(CH2)3CH(C2H5)CO2H.  It is a carboxylic acid that is widely used to prepare lipophilic metal derivatives that are soluble in nonpolar organic solvents.  2-Ethylhexanoic acid is a colorless viscous oil.  It is supplied as a racemic mixture.

Production
2-Ethylhexanoic acid is produced industrially from propylene, which is hydroformylated to give butyraldehyde.  Aldol condensation of the aldehyde gives 2-ethylhexenal, which is hydrogenated to 2-ethylhexanal.   Oxidation of this aldehyde gives the carboxylic acid.

Metal ethylhexanoates

2-Ethylhexanoic acid forms compounds with metal cations that have stoichiometry as metal acetates.  These ethylhexanoate complexes are used in organic and industrial chemical synthesis.  They function as catalysts in polymerizations as well as for oxidation reactions  as "oil drying agents."  They are highly soluble in nonpolar solvents.  These metal complexes are often described as salts.  They are, however, not ionic but charge-neutral coordination complexes.  Their structures are akin to the corresponding acetates.

Examples of metal ethylhexanoates
 Hydroxyl aluminium bis(2-ethylhexanoate), used as a thickener
 Tin(II) ethylhexanoate (CAS# 301-10-0), a catalyst for polylactide and  poly(lactic-co-glycolic acid).
 Cobalt(II) ethylhexanoate (CAS#  136-52-7), a drier for alkyd resins
 Nickel(II) ethylhexanoate (CAS# 4454-16-4)

See also
 2-Ethylhexanol

References

Alkanoic acids